Roads to the South is a 1978 French film directed by Joseph Losey. It stars Yves Montand and Miou-Miou. The film is a sequel to The War is Over (1966), which was directed by Alain Resnais.

Cast
Yves Montand as Jean Larrea
Miou-Miou as Julia
Laurent Malet as Laurent Larrea
France Lambiotte as Eva Larrea
José Luis Gómez as Miguel

References

External links

1978 films
Spanish drama films
Films directed by Joseph Losey
1970s French-language films
1970s Spanish films